Al-Jurjani or simply Jurjani may refer to any of several historical Persian scholars:

 Abu Sa'id al-Darir al-Jurjani (died 845), mathematician and astronomer
 Al-Masihi, Abu Sahl al-Masihi al-Jurjani (960–1000), physician and teacher of Avicenna
 Abd al-Qahir al-Jurjani (died 1078), scholar of the Arabic language, literary theorist and grammarian
 Zayn al-Din al-Jurjani (1040–1136), royal Islamic physician and author of the Thesaurus of the Shah of Khwarazm
 Al-Sharif al-Jurjani (1339–1414), Sunni Hanafi Muslim scholar
 Rustam Jurjani, 16th century physician who lived in India and author of the Supplies Of Nizamshah

See also
Gorgani (disambiguation)
Astarabadi

Arabic-language surnames
Jurjani